Eli Marie Raasok (born 21 November 1996) is a Norwegian handball player who plays for Storhamar HE.

On 4 February 2021, it was announced that she had signed a 1-year contract with Randers HK, from  Silkeborg-Voel KFUM.

She participated at the 2016 Women's Junior World Handball Championship in Russia, placing 5th.

Achievements
Norwegian League
 Silver: 2021/2022

References

1996 births
Living people
Norwegian female handball players
Norwegian expatriate sportspeople in Denmark
Handball players from Oslo